This article is about the particular significance of the year 1781 to Wales and its people.

Incumbents
Lord Lieutenant of Anglesey - Sir Nicholas Bayly, 2nd Baronet
Lord Lieutenant of Brecknockshire and Monmouthshire – Charles Morgan of Dderw
Lord Lieutenant of Caernarvonshire - Thomas Wynn (until 27 December); Thomas Bulkeley, 7th Viscount Bulkeley (from 27 December)
Lord Lieutenant of Cardiganshire – Wilmot Vaughan, 1st Earl of Lisburne
Lord Lieutenant of Carmarthenshire – John Vaughan  
Lord Lieutenant of Denbighshire - Richard Myddelton  
Lord Lieutenant of Flintshire - Sir Roger Mostyn, 5th Baronet 
Lord Lieutenant of Glamorgan – John Stuart, Lord Mountstuart
Lord Lieutenant of Merionethshire - Sir Watkin Williams-Wynn, 4th Baronet
Lord Lieutenant of Montgomeryshire – George Herbert, 2nd Earl of Powis
Lord Lieutenant of Pembrokeshire – Sir Hugh Owen, 5th Baronet
Lord Lieutenant of Radnorshire – Edward Harley, 4th Earl of Oxford and Earl Mortimer

Bishop of Bangor – John Moore
Bishop of Llandaff – Shute Barrington
Bishop of St Asaph – Jonathan Shipley
Bishop of St Davids – John Warren

Events
June - The Chancery court agrees the sale of the Kinmel estate to a London buyer.
Richard Price is made an honorary LL.D. by Yale University, in the company of George Washington.

Arts and literature

New books
Thomas Pennant - Tours in Wales, volume 2

Music
John Parry (harpist) - British Harmony, being a Collection of Antient Welsh Airs

Births
11 March (baptised) - Lucy Thomas, colliery owner ('The Mother of the Welsh Steam Coal Trade') (d. 1847)
?November - William Williams of Wern, Independent minister (d. 1840)

Deaths
4 April - Henry Thrale, brewer, 556-57
7 May - Sir William Owen, 4th Baronet of Orielton, politician, 84
12 October - David Powell (Dewi Nantbrân), Franciscan friar and author

References

Wales
Wales